Jessica Keenan Wynn (born Jessica Keenan Armstrong; 12 June 1986) is an American actress and singer. She is known for her roles as Heather Chandler in the off-Broadway production of Heathers: The Musical and Young Tanya in Mamma Mia! Here We Go Again.

Personal life
Wynn is the daughter of Edwyna "Wynnie" Wynn and Roger Armstrong. Her legal surname is Armstrong, but she changed it to carry on the Wynn name. 

She is the niece of actor Ned Wynn and screenwriter Tracy Keenan Wynn; the granddaughter of Keenan Wynn, whom she was named after; the great-granddaughter of comedian Ed Wynn; and the great-great-granddaughter of Frank Keenan, all of whom were prominent actors.

Stage performances

Filmography

Film

Television

References

External links
 
 

1986 births
Living people
American stage actresses
American film actresses
American people of Czech-Jewish descent
American people of Romanian-Jewish descent
Actresses from Los Angeles
21st-century American women